Streptomyces albofaciens is a bacterium species from the genus  of Streptomyces which produces oxytetracycline, spiramycin, albopeptin A, albopeptin B and alpomycin.

See also 
 List of Streptomyces species

References

Further reading

External links
Type strain of Streptomyces albofaciens at BacDive -  the Bacterial Diversity Metadatabase

albofaciens
Bacteria described in 1960